Gilbert Slater (27 August 1864 – 8 March 1938) was an English economist and social reformer of the early 20th century.

Gilbert was born in Plymouth in 1864. His father was a school teacher. Slater studied economics and worked as a professor. In 1909, he was appointed principal of Ruskin College and served from 1909 to 1915. From 1915 to 1921, Slater served as the Professor of Economics at the University of Madras. Slater died in 1938 at the age of 73.

Slater is known for rural developments he initiated in India. Slater is also known for his love for Dravidian culture and civilization and for theorizing that the works of Shakespeare were actually written by several different writers at different times.

Early life 

Slater was born at Plymouth, England on 27 August 1864 to a schoolmaster, Daniel Slater.

Academic career 

Slater graduated in economics and taught the subject as an academic. He wrote one of the first PhDs at the London School of Economics. Enclosure of Common Fields in the Eighteenth and Nineteenth Centuries was published in 1905. (LSE Magazine Winter 2010)

Principal of Ruskin College 

Slater served as the Principal of Ruskin College, Oxford from 1909 to 1915.

In India 

In 1915, Slater sailed to India to take over as the first Professor of economics and head of the new economics department of the University of Madras which was founded in 1912. and chaired the economics department of Madras University from 1915 to 1921. Even before he arrived in India, Slater had learnt the Tamil language and was ready for his new assignment. During his tenure, Gilbert and his team performed a detailed survey of the villages in the Madras Presidency and analyzed the prevailing economic conditions. One of the people who assisted Slater in his study was South Indian businessman M. Ct. Muthiah Chettiar. The results of the survey were published in the book Some South Indian Villages. During his tenure, Slater worked hard to eradicate poverty.

Slater also demonstrated a keen interest in the culture and civilization of South India. Back in England in 1924, he published his book The Dravidian Elements in Indian Culture.

Slater was nominated to the Madras Legislative Council in 1921 and served for a year until his return to the United Kingdom in 1922. During his term in the council, he recommended the appointment of a committee to investigate the feasibility of the adoption of a common script for the whole Presidency. Slater's motion was, however, defeated by a huge margin.

On the choice of medium of instruction, he wrote:

Slater co-authored the book Indigenous Banking in India along with L. C. Jain in 1929.

The Seven Shakespeares 

Back in England, Slater studied Shakespeare and proposed a new variation of theory that the works attributed to Shakespeare were not his. In The Seven Shakespeares (1931) he argued that the works were actually written by seven different authors: Francis Bacon, Edward de Vere, 17th Earl of Oxford, Sir Walter Raleigh, William Stanley, 6th Earl of Derby, Christopher Marlowe, Mary Sidney, Countess of Pembroke, and Roger Manners, 5th Earl of Rutland. This so-called "group theory" revived Delia Bacon's early model of collaborative authorship and brought together all the most popular recent candidates.

Death 

Slater died on 8 March 1938 at the age of 73. He had married, in 1897, Violet, daughter of Joseph Oakeshott, of East Barnet, and Eliza Maria, née Dodd; she was a sister of the civil servant and Fabian Joseph Francis Oakeshott.

On 22 January 2009 a portrait of Gilbert Slater was unveiled at the campus of the University of Madras by the Finance Minister of Tamil Nadu, K. Anbazhagan.

Notes

References

Works 

 
 
  (republished as "The Growth of Modern England" in 1939)

External links
 

1864 births
1938 deaths
Writers from Plymouth, Devon
British people in colonial India
English economists
Ruskin College
Academic staff of the University of Madras